Kaset Wisai is a district (amphoe) in southwestern Roi Et province, Thailand.

Geography
Neighboring districts are (from the north clockwise): Chaturaphak Phiman, Mueang Suang, Suwannaphum of Roi Et Province; Phayakkhaphum Phisai of Maha Sarakham province; Pathum Rat of Roi Et Province; and Wapi Pathum of Maha Sarakham province.

History
Originally named Nong Waeng, it was renamed Kaset Wisai in 1939.

Administration
The district is divided into 13 sub-districts (tambons), which are further subdivided into 175 villages (mubans). There are two townships (thesaban tambons): Kaset Wisai and Ku Ka Sing. Each covers parts of the same-named tambon. There are a further 13 tambon administrative organizations (TAO).

References

External links
amphoe.com

Kaset Wisai